Muhammadi Steamship Company Limited was one of the oldest locally owned shipping companies in Pakistan until it was nationalised in the early 1970s.

History
The company was incorporated on 12 May 1947 . In 1949, it became the first Pakistani shipping line to be publicly listed on the Karachi Stock Exchange.

Muhammadi House on McLeod Road (now I. I. Chundrigar Road) was the headquarters of the company.

Muhammad Ali Habib and Kasim Dada were major share holders of the company till 1959–1960. However, after their departure from the scene, company went into deep financial crisis. The company was nationalized by the Government of Pakistan under then President Zulfikar Ali Bhutto. It was later merged with other Pakistani nationalized shipping companies to create the Pakistan National Shipping Corporation.

Ships

See also

 Merchant Navy (Pakistan)
 Merchant Navy

References

Defunct shipping companies of Pakistan
Companies based in Karachi
Transport companies established in 1947
History of Karachi
1947 establishments in Pakistan
1970s disestablishments in Pakistan